Joshua Atwill Pais (born June 21, 1958) is an American actor and acting coach. He has appeared in the films Teenage Mutant Ninja Turtles (1990), Music of the Heart (1999), Assassination of a High School President (2008), I Saw the Light (2015) and Motherless Brooklyn (2019). He also appeared in nine episodes of Ray Donovan.

He is also the director of the 2002 documentary 7th Street (the street he grew up on in Alphabet City, Manhattan) depicting various personages living there between the years 1992-2002.

Early life
Pais was born in New York City, New York, and is the son of Lila Lee (née Atwill), a painter and poet, and Dutch-born physicist, professor, and writer Abraham Pais. His father was from a Jewish family, and his mother converted to Judaism.

Career
He has appeared in Hollywood films including Teenage Mutant Ninja Turtles (in which he was both in the costume and was the voice) as Raphael, Music of the Heart, Scream 3, It Runs in the Family, Phone Booth, Little Manhattan and Find Me Guilty. He played Assistant M.E. Borak in 15 episodes of the series Law & Order, between 1990 and 2002. He also played the Spanish teacher in the film Assassination of a High School President. He had a recurring role as an obnoxious movie producer on the American crime drama series Ray Donovan. He also appeared as a lawyer on 2 Broke Girls.

Personal life
Pais married actress Lisa Emery on August 27, 1990.

Filmography

Film

Television

References

External links

1958 births
Living people
Male actors from New York City
American acting coaches
American male film actors
American male television actors
American male voice actors
American people of Dutch-Jewish descent
American people of Portuguese-Jewish descent
Jewish American male actors
20th-century American male actors
21st-century American male actors
Drama teachers
20th-century American Jews
21st-century American Jews
American people of Portuguese descent